Scotch Bonnet Records is a reggae and dub record label established in Glasgow in 2005.   Scrub a Dub is a sub-label of Scotch Bonnet that releases bass music while the main label releases reggae tracks.  Scotch Bonnet Records releases many of the Mungo's Hi Fi releases and recordings and has released their latest album Serious Time on 2 June 2014.

Discography

Albums

Singles and EPs

References

External links
Scotch Bonnet Records Website
Scotch Bonnet Records Youtube

Reggae record labels
Scottish record labels